José Llorens (born 2 February 1938) is a Spanish former sports shooter. He competed in the 50 metre rifle, three positions and 50 metre rifle, prone events at the 1960 Summer Olympics.

References

1938 births
Living people
Spanish male sport shooters
Olympic shooters of Spain
Shooters at the 1960 Summer Olympics
Sportspeople from Barcelona